Mischa Hausserman (October 31, 1941 – August 30, 2021) was an Austrian-born American film and television actor.

Hausserman was born in Vienna, Austria on October 31, 1941. He moved to the United States in 1965, and studied acting at the Herbert Berghof Studios, before attending New York University.

He died on August 30, 2021, at the age of 79.

Filmography
1965: DM-Killer as Young Man (uncredited)
1966: Twelve O'Clock High (TV Series) as German Radioman
1966: Torn Curtain as Idealistic Young Man (uncredited)
1967: Combat! (TV Series) as Johann Schiller
1968: Counterpoint as (uncredited)
1968: In Enemy Country as (uncredited)
1971: Ironside (TV Series) as Anton Hlinka
1972: The Salzburg Connection as Lev Benedescu
1974: Situation as Michael (as Michael Hausserman)
1979: Survival Run as Helicopter Pilot
1979: Goldengirl as Pilot
1983: Voyagers! (TV Series) as German Broadcaster
1983: Scarecrow and Mrs. King (TV Series) as Ivan
1984: The Evil That Men Do as Karl Haussman
1985: Missing in Action 2: The Beginning as Kelly
1986: Murphy's Law as Detective Dave Manzarek
1987: Assassination as Danzig
1995: Die Hard with a Vengeance as Mischa
1996: Eraser as Airplane Captain (uncredited)
1996: Amanda as Dr. Knudsen
1999: The 13th Warrior as Rethel The Archer
1999: The Thomas Crown Affair as Jimmy
2002: Rollerball as Gold Coach (final film role)

References

External links
 

1941 births
2021 deaths
20th-century American male actors
21st-century American male actors
American male film actors
American male television actors
Austrian emigrants to the United States
Male actors from Vienna
Austrian male film actors
Austrian male television actors